Jaume Balius i Vila (Barcelona, 1750 - Còrdova, 1822), Spanish Jaime Balius y Vila, was a Catalan classical composer.

Works and recordings
Adonde infiel dragón – Jaime Balius & Ignace Pleyel Música para la Catedral de Córdoba en el ocaso del clasicismo  Vanni Moretto, director María Hinojosa, soprano Orquesta Barroca de Sevilla

References

1750 births
1822 deaths
Spanish composers
Spanish male composers
People from Barcelona